The Embassy of Nicaragua in Washington, D.C. is the Republic of Nicaragua's diplomatic mission to the United States. It's located at 1627 New Hampshire Avenue, Northwest, Washington, D.C., in the Dupont Circle neighborhood. 
The embassy also operates Consulates-General in Los Angeles, San Francisco, Houston, New Orleans, Miami, and New York City.

The Ambassador is Francisco Obadiah Campbell Hooker.

Building
Dr. Louis C. Lehr (brother of Henry Symes Lehr) and his wife, Marie, were the original occupants of the building. It was designed and built by Clarke Waggaman in 1913–1914. Notable occupants of the building have included Norman H. Davis (while serving as Undersecretary of State), Raymond T. Baker (while serving as Director of the U.S. Mint), Joseph H. Himes (while serving in Congress), Roy D. Chapin (while serving as Secretary of Commerce), and Guillermo Sevilla-Sacasa (while serving as Nicaraguan ambassador).

Services
The embassy operates several services and offices, responsible for different areas of policy and liaising with the relevant American bodies, the most notable of whom are listed below.

Chancery
The Chancery is the main diplomatic and political body. It is responsible for coordination with the American government on matters, particularly foreign policy, that affect Nicaragua, however, the majority of the diplomacy is conducted by the ambassador, leaving the chancery to liaise with the Nicaraguan government and coordinate with the Press Service in matters of public policy. The diplomats of the chancery take responsibility for a specific policy area and may stand in for the ambassador in his absence.
The Chancery has attaches based in each of the five regional consulates.

Press and Communications Office
The Press Service is responsible for events, as well as coordinating press releases and conferences, including the provision of designated spokesmen. The office also monitors American press coverage of issues pertaining to Nicaragua and reports back to the ambassador and to Managua.

The Cultural Service
The Cultural Services of the embassy is located at the embassy. Its responsibility is in facilitating "cultural exchange" between the two nations, a role that can be creative, informative or merely administrative. The duties of the service include promoting Nicaraguan creative works in cultural and academic institutions across Nicaragua, with the help of the attaches in regional consulates.

Consulates 
The ambassador is also ultimately responsible for the five regional consulates:

Apart from the embassy in Washington, Nicaragua's diplomatic operations in the United States include:

a consulate general in Houston, Texas (Consul General Samuel Trejos-Córdoba)
a consulate general in Los Angeles, California (Consul General Leopoldo Castrillo-Ramos)
a consulate general in Miami, Florida (Consul General Leyla Cisneros Vega)
a consulate general in New York City, (Consul General María Téllez-Velásquez)
a consulate general in San Francisco, California (Consul General Denis Galeano-Cornejo)

Previous Ambassadors

1895 Horacio Guzman
1898-1909 Luis Felipe Corea
1908-1909 Pedro González 
1909-1909 Rodolfo Espinosa Ramírez
1909-1911 Chargé d'affaires Felipe Rodríguez 
1911-1913 Chargé d'affaires Salvador Castrillo
1913-1917  Emiliano Chamorro Vargas
1917-1921 Chargé d'affaires  Ramon Enriquez
1921-1923  Emiliano Chamorro Vargas
1923-1921 Chargé d'affaires 
1929-1933 Chargé d'affaires Evaristo Carazo
1933-1933 Chargé d'affaires Luis  Debayle
1933-1936  Henri Debayle
1937-1943  León Debayle
1943-1979 Guillermo Sevilla-Sacasa (Dean of the Diplomatic Corps in Washington D.C from January 1958 to July 16, 1979)
1979-1979   Acting Chargé d'affaires  Adeline Gröns-Schindler de Argüello-Olivas
1979-1980  Interim Chargé d'affaires Adeline Gröns-Schindler de Argüello-Olivas and Francisco d'Escoto Brockmann  
1980-1981  Chargé d'affaires Francisco d'Escoto Brockmann  
1981-1982 Arturo J. Cruz
1982-1983 Francisco Fiallos-Navarro
1983-1983  Chargé d'affaires  Manuel Cordero
1983-1984 Jose Jarquin-Lopez
1984-1988 Carlos Tunnermann Bernheim
1988-1990 No ambassador diplomatic relations severed
1990-1993 Ernesto Palazio
1993-1996 Roberto Mayorga-Cortes
1997-2000 Francisco Aguirre-Sacasa
2000-2002 Alfonso Ortega Urbina
2002-2003 Carlos Ulvert-Sanchez
2003-2007 Salvador Stadthagen-Icaza
2007-2009 Arturo Cruz Sequeira
2010–present Francisco Campbell-Hooker
Chief of Protocol, Nicaragua

References

External links

Nicargua
Washington, D.C.
Nicaragua–United States relations
Dupont Circle
 
Nicaragua
United States